Pultenaea craigiana is a species of flowering plant in the family Fabaceae and is endemic to near Ravensthorpe in the south of Western Australia. It is an erect, spindly shrub with densely hairy young stems, egg-shaped leaves with the narrower end towards the base, and yellow and red flowers.

Description
The sepals are joined at the base, forming a green tube with red lobes.

Taxonomy and naming
Pultenaea craigiana was first formally described in 2009 by Carolyn F. Wilkins, L.A. Orthia and Michael Crisp in the journal Nuytsia from specimens collected by Gillian F. Craig near the southern limit of the Ravensthorpe Range. The specific epithet (craigiana) honours the collector of the type specimens.

Distribution
This pultenaea grows in woodland and in burned shrubland and is only known from near the old Kundip townsite south of Ravensthorpe.

Conservation status
Pultenaea craigiana is classified as "Priority Three" by the Government of Western Australia Department of Parks and Wildlife, meaning that it is poorly known and known from only a few locations but is not under imminent threat.

References

craigiana
Eudicots of Western Australia
Plants described in 2009